Marshal Montgomery Square, usually shortened to Montgomery Square, is a major intersection in the Brussels municipality of Woluwe-Saint-Pierre, Belgium. It is named in honour of Field Marshal Bernard Montgomery, a senior British Army officer who served in the First World War, the Irish War of Independence and the Second World War. It is situated on the intersection of the Avenue de Tervueren/Tervurenlaan, the / and the /.

Below the square, Montgomery metro station serves as the first station on the eastern branch of line 1 of the Brussels Metro. The station is also a stop for trams 7, 25, 39 and 44, while tram 81 and various Brussels Intercommunal Transport Company (STIB/MIVB) bus services stop at surface level.

Description
At surface level, the traffic intersection takes the form of a multi-lane roundabout. Traffic not turning is routed through two tunnels; the Tervuren Tunnel takes vehicles travelling on the Avenue de Tervueren/Tervurenlaan under the junction, while traffic on the Greater Ring (from the / and the /) is routed away from the intersection via the Montgomery Tunnel.

The centre of the roundabout is occupied by a large fountain, while a statue of Montgomery stands on the Avenue de Tervueren facing it.

See also

 History of Brussels
 Belgium in "the long nineteenth century"

References

Notes

Squares in Brussels
Woluwe-Saint-Pierre